Mandy Debono (born 24 November 1987) is a Maltese footballer who plays as a defender for First Division club Swieqi United FC. She has been a member of the Malta women's national team.

References

1987 births
Living people
Women's association football defenders
Maltese women's footballers
Malta women's international footballers
Hibernians F.C. players